is a compilation album composed of B-sides released by the Japanese rock group Plastic Tree. It was released on September 5, 2007.

Track listing
ベランダ.　Veranda
lilac
光合成　Kougousei
水彩　Suisai
存在理由 Sonzai riyuu
パラノイア Paranoia
六月の雨 Rokugatsu no ame
本日は晴天なり Honjitsu wa seiten nari
ジンテーゼ Synthesis
冬の海は遊泳禁止で Fuyu no umi wa yuuei kinshi de
月の光をたよりに Tsuki no hikari wo tayori ni
エンジェルダスト Angel dust
白い足跡 Shiroi ashiato
ロム Romu
藍より青く Ai yori aoku

2007 compilation albums
Plastic Tree albums
B-side compilation albums